St. Mary's Mission may refer to:

 St. Mary's Mission (Kansas)
 St. Mary's Mission (Montana)